General Radio Company (later, GenRad) was a broad-line manufacturer of electronic test equipment in Massachusetts, U.S. from 1915 to 2001.

History
On June 14, 1915, Melville Eastham and a small group of investors started General Radio Company in Cambridge, Massachusetts, a few blocks northwest of Massachusetts Institute of Technology.  During the 1950s, the company moved to West Concord, Massachusetts, where it became a major player in the automatic test equipment (ATE) business, manufacturing a line of testers for assembled printed circuit boards. It also produced extensive lines of electrical component measuring equipment, sound and vibration measurement and RLC standards.  In 1975, the company name was changed to GenRad.

In 1991, a startup QuadTech was founded as spinoff of GenRad's Instrumentation division and Precision Product lines, as well as the rights to use the "GenRad" and "General Radio" names.  In 2000, IET Labs acquired from QuadTech the GenRad RLC standards, impedance decades, megohmmeters, digibridges, audio lines, stroboscope lines. Then in 2005 IET Labs purchased the Digibridge and Megohmmeter lines, which continue to be manufactured in West Roxbury, Massachusetts.  In 2001, Teradyne acquired the GenRad board test system lines, which were relocated to Teradyne's corporate campus in North Reading, Massachusetts.

Among General Radio's accomplishments over the years have been:
 The introduction of one of the world's first portable oscilloscopes.
 The production of many high-precision standards for inductance, resistance, and capacitance.
 The production of the stroboscope as the Strobotac.
 The production of the sound level meter.
 The Variac variable autotransformer, which was a U.S. trademark of General Radio from 1934 to 2001.
 Invention of the "five-way" binding post connector. 
 Invention of the GR connector.

Gallery

References

Further reading

External links 
 General Radio History - Funding Universe
 General Radio Historical Society - IET Labs
 Product Catalog archive
 Product Manual archive
 Experimenter Magazine archive

Electronics companies of the United States
Electronics companies established in 1915
1915 establishments in Massachusetts
2001 disestablishments in Massachusetts
Electronics companies disestablished in 2001
2001 mergers and acquisitions